Memo Akten (born 1975) is an artist and creative technologist based in London (UK). He is known for the reappropriation of advanced electronics, software and hardware systems to create multimedia experiences that he describes as an attempt to "change our perceptions on our relationship with science, nature technology and culture".

Akten's 2013 work "FORMS" won the Golden Nica at the Prix Ars Electronica. He has shown work at the Victoria & Albert Museum, Royal Opera House, Royal Festival Hall, and Queen Elizabeth Hall.

Career
In 1997, Akten received a Bachelor's Degree in civil engineering from Bogazici University. In 2012, Akten co-created a live theatrical performance involving kinetic light systems controlled by quadrotor drones. The exhibition was called "Meet Your Creator" and was created for the Saatchi & Saatchi New Directors' Showcase.

In 2013, Akten received the Prix Ars Electronica Golden Nica for his collaboration with Quayola on a digital 3D project called ‘Forms’. His work has been featured in publications such as Wallpaper, Dazed, Eye magazine, Guardian, BBC, Financial Times, Wired and Dezeen.  In 2009, his works ‘Body Paint’ and ‘Gold’ started touring with the Victoria & Albert Museum’s ‘Decode’ exhibition.  In 2014 his work with Marshmallow Laser Feast ‘Laser Forest’ was part of the Barbican’s ‘Digital Revolutions’ exhibition.

As a strong supporter of open-source software, Akten is one of the core contributors to the openFrameworks project, and he gives lectures and workshops around the world. In 2007 he founded The Mega Super Awesome Visuals Company (MSA Visuals), a creative technology studio. In 2011, with two new partners this evolved into Marshmallow Laser Feast. In 2014, Memo left MLF to focus on personal work, collaborations and research.

References

British contemporary artists
Living people
Artists from London
Artists from Istanbul
1975 births